National Route 461 is a national highway of Japan connecting Nikkō, Tochigi and Takahagi, Ibaraki, with a total length of 135 km (83.89 mi).

References

National highways in Japan
Roads in Ibaraki Prefecture
Roads in Tochigi Prefecture